Thomas deMagnin Gilburg (born November 27, 1938) is a former American football player and coach. He was a punter and second-string offensive tackle for the Baltimore Colts of the National Football League (NFL) from 1961 to 1965. He was selected in the second round (21st overall) by the Colts from Syracuse University in the 1961 NFL Draft.  Gilburg was the head football coach at Franklin & Marshall College in Lancaster, Pennsylvania for 28 seasons, from 1975 until 2002, compiling a record of 160–112–2.

Head coaching record

Football

References

External links
 

1938 births
Living people
American football offensive tackles
American football punters
American lacrosse coaches
Baltimore Colts players
Hofstra Pride football coaches
Franklin & Marshall Diplomats football coaches
Lehigh Mountain Hawks football coaches
Lehigh Mountain Hawks men's lacrosse coaches
Syracuse Orange football players
People from Bronxville, New York
People from Chappaqua, New York
Sportspeople from Westchester County, New York
Coaches of American football from New York (state)
Players of American football from New York (state)